The 1972–73 English football season was Aston Villa's 73rd season in the Football League, this season playing in the Football League Second Division. Under manager Vic Crowe  Aston Villa won promotion in the previous season as champions with a record 70 points, and thus ended their two-year spell in the Third Division. By the end of the decade they would be firmly re-established as a First Division club.

The 1972 FA Charity Shield was contested between Manchester City and Aston Villa with City winning 1–0, following a penalty from striker Francis Lee.

Normally, the Charity Shield would have been contested by the First Division champions and FA Cup holders, who were Derby County and Leeds United respectively, but both declined the chance to play in the Charity Shield. Instead, Manchester City, who had finished in fourth place in the First Division; and Aston Villa, who finished as Third Division champions accepted the invitation to play. The match was played at Villa Park.

Second Division

FA Charity Shield

Notes

References

External links
AVFC History: 1972-73 season

Aston Villa F.C. seasons
Aston Villa F.C. season